Ant Street is a 1995 Austrian comedy film directed by Michael Glawogger. The film was selected as the Austrian entry for the Best Foreign Language Film at the 68th Academy Awards, but was not accepted as a nominee.

Cast
 Robert Meyer as Alfred Navratil
 Bibiane Zeller as Frau Gerhartl
 Nikolaus Paryla as Roland Wanecek
 Monika Tajmar as Frau Elvira Wanecek
 Wolfgang Böck as Ernstl Freitag
 Brigitte Kren as Rosi Freitag

See also
 List of submissions to the 68th Academy Awards for Best Foreign Language Film
 List of Austrian submissions for the Academy Award for Best Foreign Language Film

References

External links
 

1995 films
1995 comedy films
1990s German-language films
Austrian comedy films